Charles R. "Buckets" Goldenberg (April 15, 1911 – April 16, 1986) was an All-Pro National Football League (NFL) American football player. He is often credited as the originator of the draw play by forcing Sid Luckman to hand off with his blitzing.

Biography
Goldenberg was born in Odessa, Russian Empire, and was Jewish.  He and his family immigrated to Wisconsin in the United States when he was four years of age. His nickname, a play on "buttocks," was "Buckets." He grew up in Milwaukee, Wisconsin, and attended and played football for West Division High School in Milwaukee, where he was an All-City halfback. He played college football for the University of Wisconsin Badgers football team.

In 1933 as a rookie he led the NFL in touchdowns, with seven. In 1939 he was 1st Team All-Pro (Chicago Herald Am.), and in 1942 he was 2nd Team, All-Pro (Associated Press and NFL).

Goldenberg played in 120 NFL games while starting in 69 of them. He had 108 carries for 365 yards and six touchdowns, along with 11 receptions for 111 yards and one touchdown. Most of his carries were in his first three seasons (98 of his 108). He had eight career interceptions, with 73 return yards and two touchdowns.

He wrestled as a professional in the off-season. Later in his career, he opened up restaurants.

Goldenberg is one of ten players who were named to the National Football League 1930s All-Decade Team who have not been inducted into the Pro Football Hall of Fame.  He was named “Outstanding Jewish Athlete of All Time” by the Green Bay B’nai B’rith Lodge in 1969, inducted into the Packers Hall of Fame in 1971, and elected to the Wisconsin Athletic Hall of Fame in 1973.

See also
List of select Jewish football players

References

External links
Obituary, Professional Football Researchers Association
 

1911 births
1986 deaths
Sportspeople from Odesa
People from Odessky Uyezd
Jews from the Russian Empire
Ukrainian Jews
Emigrants from the Russian Empire to the United States
Ukrainian players of American football
American football offensive guards
American football running backs
American people of Ukrainian-Jewish descent
Wisconsin Badgers football players
Green Bay Packers players
Jewish American sportspeople
Players of American football from Wisconsin
20th-century American Jews